Denpasar (Balinese: ᬤᬾᬦ᭄ᬧᬲᬃ) is the capital of Bali and the main gateway to the island. The city is also a hub for other cities in the Lesser Sunda Islands.

With the rapid growth of the tourism industry in Bali, Denpasar has encouraged and promoted business activities and ventures, contributing to it having the highest growth rate in Bali Province. The population of Denpasar was 725,314 at the 2020 Census, down from 788,445 at the 2010 Census due to pandemic outflow, despite having hit 879,098 in 2015, while the metropolitan area centred on Denpasar (called Sarbagita) had 2,388,680 residents in 2020.  Pandemic and travel related closures has further exacerbated the population loss, with mid 2022 estimate of 653,136 people.

Etymology
The name Denpasar – from the Balinese words "den", meaning north, and "pasar", meaning market – indicates the city's origins as a market-town, on the site of what is now Kumbasari Market (formerly "Peken Payuk"), in the northern part of the modern city.

History

Colonial era
In the 18th and 19th century, Denpasar functioned as the capital of the Hindu Majapahit Kingdom of Badung. Thus, the city was formerly called Badung. The royal palace was looted and razed during the Dutch intervention in 1906. A statue in Taman Puputan (Denpasar's central square) commemorates the 1906 Puputan, in which as many as a thousand Balinese, including the King and his court, committed mass suicide in front of invading Dutch troops, rather than surrender to them.

Independence era
In 1958, Denpasar became the seat of government for the Province of Bali. It remained the administrative centre of both Badung Regency and the City of Denpasar.

Both Denpasar and Badung Regency have experienced rapid physical, economic, social, and cultural growth. Denpasar has become not only the seat of government, but also the centre of commerce, education, industry, and tourism.

With an average population growth of 4.05% per annum, accompanied by rapid development, came a variety of urban problems. It was later resolved  that meeting the needs and demands of the burgeoning urban community would be best addressed by giving Denpasar administrative independence from Badung Regency.

An agreement was reached to raise the status of Denpasar to that of an autonomous city and on 15 January 1992, Act No. 1 of 1992 officially established the City of Denpasar. It was inaugurated by the Minister of Home Affairs on 27 February 1992.

On 16 November 2009, in a further administrative realignment, Regulation Number 67 shifted the capital of Badung Regency from Denpasar to Mangupura.

Geography

While the total area of 127.78 km2 or 2.18% of the total area of Bali Province. From the use of land, 2,768 hectares of land are paddy, 10,001 hectares are dry land, while the remaining land area is 9 hectares.

Badung River divides Denpasar, after which the river empties into the Gulf of Benoa.

Climate
Denpasar, located just south of the equator, has a tropical monsoon climate (Köppen climate classification: Am), with hot and humid weather year-round. Due to this, there is little temperature change throughout the year, with temperatures averaging about 28 degrees Celsius. The year is divided into two seasons: wet and dry. The wet season lasts roughly from November to May, while the dry season lasts from June to October.

Demography

The city's population was counted as 788,445 in 2010, up from 533,252 in the previous decade.  The provincial website lists the December 2017 population at 897,300.

Denpasar's population grew about 4% per year in the period from 2000 to 2010, Denpasar grew much faster from 2005 to 2010 than in the previous five years. The lingering effects of the 2002 Bali bombings had a major depressive effect on tourism, jobs, and immigration from other islands.  However, if current trends continue, Denpasar is expected to easily surpass a million residents by the next census. There are about 4.57% more men than women in Denpasar.  The 2015 intercensal survey (SUPAS) reported a population of 879,098 people for the city.

Approximately 63.3% of the population are Hindus (BPS 2020), while Islam is the largest minority religion (28.65%), followed by Christianity (6.45%), Buddhism (1.47%), and Confucianism (0.03%).

Administration

Administratively, the city government consists of four districts, subdivided into 43 sub-districts with 209 villages.  Denpasar has developed numerous measures to improve public services.

Districts

Denpasar is divided into four districts (kecamatan), listed below with their 2010 Census populations:
 Denpasar Selatan (South Denpasar) 244,851
 Denpasar Timur (East Denpasar) 138,404
 Denpasar Barat (West Denpasar) 229,435
 Denpasar Utara (North Denpasar) 175,899

Greater Denpasar
Greater Denpasar spills out into the tourist regions, including Kuta and Ubud.  The continuous built-up area includes nearly all of Badung Regency (except Petang District), and most of Gianyar Regency (except for Payangan District), and is known as Sarbagita, from Denpa"Sar"+"BA"dung+"GI"anyar+"TA"banan, a name made official by Presidential Regulation Number 45 of 2011, despite Tabanan just beginning to succumb to urban sprawl. See also List of metropolitan areas in Indonesia.

Economy

The development of tourism and structural changes in the economy have had a strong impact on Denpasar. Trade, hotels, and restaurants dominate the city's gross regional domestic product.

Also boosting the economy of Denpasar is the production of craft items such as souvenir carvings and sculptures. The craft industry, however, is experiencing pressure due to the impact of the global financial crises and competition from other Asian developing countries such as Vietnam, Thailand, India, Malaysia and China. These competitor countries maximize the scale of production by utilizing industrial technology, while at Denpasar the craft industry remains focused on traditional skills and hand-made goods, limiting the quantity of production.

Architecture

Bali was once known for its mud walls and thatched gates but gated residential developments and shop houses now characterize urban Bali.
 

During the late 19th century, the built environment was being constructed based on the political situation of the city. This resulted in the residence of the ruling family becoming the centre of the city. 

Market squares played an important role in the Badung kingdom, and it continued to do so when the colonial powers came to exert control over Bali. Over the course of the 20th century, Denpasar faced the challenges of changing urban landscapes brought about by political changes. The developments that were brought about by the colonial powers were regarded as eroding the indigenous culture of Bali. Although Denpasar became known as a 'settler city', there was still a strong attachment to the indigenous culture.

Denpasar has undergone massive unplanned development during the 21st century, due to the expansion of tourism leading to the construction of increasingly more modern facilities in the heart of the city. Nonetheless, the market square still plays an important role, with its façade representing traditional elements of the Balinese culture.

Tourism 

Denpasar has various attractions. The white sandy beaches are well-known all over the island. The surfing beach is Serangan Island. Sanur beach has calmer waters and is excellent for sunbathing and kitesurfing.

Ten minutes from the Ngurah Rai International Airport lies the town of Kuta (within Badung Regency not administratively under the city jurisdiction), where most of the hotels, restaurants, malls, cafes, marketplaces, and spas that cater to tourists are located. In the Denpasar area, all kinds of Balinese handicrafts are represented in local shops. These include artwork, pottery, textiles, and silver. Batik cloth is sold all over Denpasar, and batik sarongs and men's shirts are widely available.

Education

Denpasar has several notable universities and institutions. Some of them are
 Udayana University
 Warmadewa University
 University of National Education
 Dwijendra University
 Mahasaraswati University of Denpasar
 Indonesian Institute of the Arts, Denpasar

Transportation

Air

The city is served by Ngurah Rai International Airport, one of the busiest in Indonesia.

Sea
Benoa Harbour is the entrance to the Denpasar by sea and is currently managed by PT Pelindo III. The port is located about 10 km from the city center, and has been operating since 1924.

Land
Public transport in Denpasar, especially for urban transportation, is becoming ineffective and inefficient, with only 30% of vehicles still in operation as of 2010. Public transport is not popular and is used by only about 3% of the total population. Meanwhile, the growth of private vehicle ownership is at 11% per year  and is not comparable with the construction of new roads. Congestion in the city of Denpasar is unavoidable due to this reason.

Since August 2011, the city has operated a bus rapid transit system called Trans Sarbagita. Two main routes and some feeder lines are operated daily from 5 a.m. until 9 p.m. There is no dedicated lane for the buses: they run on main streets. In 2012 an average of 2,800 passengers per day used the service. 

 Corridor 1 Kota–GWK
 Corridor 2 Kota–Nusa Dua

The central government's Ministry of Transport initiated another system called as Trans Metro Dewata in 7 September 2020. The system now serves 5 corridors, all also without separate lane, focusing more on the city. 

 Corridor 1 (K1B): Sentral Parkir Kuta Badung – Terminal Pesiapan Tabanan
 Corridor 2 (K2B): GOR Ngurah Rai – Bandara Ngurah Rai
 Corridor 3 (K3B): Terminal Ubung – Pantai Matahari Terbit
 Corridor 4 (K4B): Terminal Ubung – Sentral Parkir Monkey Forest
 Corridor 5 (K5B): Sentral Parkir Kuta Badung–Terminal Ubung

Two major improvements to the road system were completed in 2013. In August, the underpass at the Dewa Ruci intersection was opened. It is slightly beyond the bounds of Denpasar but was co-financed by the town because of the expected positive effects on traffic in Denpasar.Then the four-lane Bali Mandara Toll Road was opened on 1 October, connecting Benoa Harbor, Ngurah Rai Airport, and Nusa Dua.

Sport
Denpasar has hosted numerous international and national sporting events. Denpasar was the venue for 2008 Asian Beach Games in Bali. Denpasar also held 2009 Asian Archery Championships.

In football, Denpasar is home to the football club Perseden Denpasar, which plays in the Liga 3.

Culture and sights
While arts and culture in Denpasar are largely synonymous with that of Hindu art and culture, there has also been a high level of interaction with other cultures that accompanied the arrival of visitors from all walks of life.  Traditional values inspired by Hindu religious rituals still strongly influence the city.

Traditional Balinese culture is still deeply rooted in Denpasar. It may include values, norms and behavior in society based on patrilineal kinship systems.  However, over time many of the customary laws have been disputed by people, especially regarding matters of gender and inheritance.

Denpasar has various sights to offer:
Pura Jagatnatha is the most important Hindu temple of Denpasar. It was built in 1953.
 is the former royal palace of Denpasar, which was destroyed in a fire during the Dutch intervention in Bali (1906). The palace was rebuilt in a comparatively modest style and can be visited.
Pura Maospahit is a Hindu temple that was built in the 14th century and heavily damaged by the 1917 Bali earthquake and rebuilt afterward. The temple houses two impressive statues of Garuda and Batara Bayu, a mystic giant.
Pura Pengerebongan  as one of the Hindu temples in Denpasar whose existence is very strongly related to the history of the palace in Kesiman. The temple is located on Jalan WR. Supratman, Denpasar, has a unique history and traditional tradition, namely Ngerebong trance bulk which is held every Redite Pon Medangsia.
St. Joseph Church is a Roman Catholic church built in a Hindu style.
Denpasar City Tour  There's no better way to take a deep dive into the rich cultural heritage of Bali, both historical and contemporary, than via this exploration of the island's most populous city.
Bajra Sandhi Monument is a major landmark in Denpasar, set right in the centre of the Renon Square (otherwise locally referred to simply as, 'Puputan Renon'). The site is adjacent to the Bali Governor's office and is hard to miss with its grand structure that resembles a Balinese Hindu priest's praying bell, or 'bajra'. Inside the base is a museum that displays various historical dioramas of the people's past struggle for independence.

Museums
The Bali Museum features Balinese art and history. The museum is built in the traditional Balinese style. There are four main buildings inside the museum, each with their own unique specialization of exhibits.

Sister cities

Denpasar is twinned with:

  Palembang, Indonesia
  Veracruz, Veracruz, Mexico
  Gran Canaria, Spain
  Phuket, Thailand
  Haikou, China
  George Town, Malaysia

See also

 Bali Museum
 Denpasar International Airport
 List of twin towns and sister cities in Indonesia

References

External links 

 
 Official site

 
Populated places in Bali
Cities in Indonesia
Provincial capitals in Indonesia
1788 establishments in Asia